Jean Dieuzaide (20 June 1921 – 18 September 2003) was a French photographer.

Early life and education 
Dieuzaide was born on 20 June 1921 in Grenade, Haute-Garonne, and at 13 was given a cardboard Coronet 6 x 9 camera. He attended secondary schools in Toulouse, Bordeaux, Cannes and Nice and during WW2 he photographed while in training camps in 1942 and documented young people in Provence. From this period,  he signed much of his work ‘Yan’, his Resistance nickname, out of a concern that photography might not be a respectable occupation. On the liberation of Toulouse he decided to make photography his vocation.

Career 
Commissioned in 1944 to produce documentary work by the Presidence du Conseil, Dieuzaide set up his first studio and made one of the first portraits of General de Gaulle.In 1946 following his exhibition at the Salon de la Bibliothèque National Editions Arthaud hired him to produce La Gascogne.

His son Michel, also a photographer, was born 11 December 1951.

He is famous for his 1951 portrayal of Salvador Dalí swimming at Cadaqués, his moustache decorated with daisies, and for the 1954 Life magazine assignment to photograph a tightrope walker couple's wedding for which he climbed astride the shoulders of one of the performers. He was profiled in 1964 in a television profile Chambre Noire by M. Tournier.

Dieuzaide was a photographer in the French Humanist style and a member of Le Groupe des XV, and later of Les 30 x 40, and was the founder of the group 'Libre Expression', also practicing abstraction.  Though Dieuzaide began as a photojournalist it was his travel and architectural photography that appeared in books from the 1950s. In the seventies he created the famous French gallery Le château d’eau, pôle photographique de Toulouse in an old water tower and dominated the photographic culture of the city of Toulouse in south-west France for over two decades.

Solo exhibitions

Publications 
 1953 St Sernin de Toulouse, ed. Bourguignon
 1953 L'Espagne du Sud
 1955, L'Espagne
 1955 Le Pays Basque 
 1956 Le Portugal
 1956 Images d'Alsace
 1957 La Sardaigne
 1958 Bearn-Bigorre
 1958 Suisse romane
 1958 Roussillon roman
 1959 Tresors de la Turquie (published also in Great Britain and Germany) 
 1959 Ouercv roman
 1961 Toulouse et le Haut-Languedoc
 1961 Histoire de Toulouse
 1961 Peregrinaciones romanicas, ed. Espagnoles, Barcelona
 1962 Espagne Romane, editions Braun (Austria and Spain)
 1962 Rouergue Roman
 1962 Voix et Images de Toulouse
 1965 Sainte de Conques, Ed. Zodiaque
 1967, El Movimiento romanico en Espana
 1974 Toulouse, Cite du Destin,  Ed. Havas
 1974 Mon Aventure avec le Brai, Dieuzaide. 
 1978, J. Dieuzaide, Ed. Université Toulouse-Mirail
 1979 Dialogue avec la Lumiere, C.C.F., Toulouse
 1983 Voyage en Iberie, ContreJour

Awards 
 1951 First Prize for sports photography.
 1951 French Cup for portraiture (FIAP).
 1952 sixth prize in Popular Photography contest
 1955 first to be awarded the Niépce Prize
 1956 First Prize, international tourism color poster show, New Delhi
 1957 Edouard Belin medal (FIAP)
 1959 First Prize, national tourism colour poster, Paris
 1961 Nadar Prize for the book «Catalogne Romane» (Gens d'lmages)
 1966 Chevalier, Order of Merit. Member of the Commission des Sites of Haute-Garonne
 1967 France Cup for landscapes (FIAP)
 1969 Lucien Lorelle Cup (Bordeaux).
 1969 Honorary member, French Federation of Photographic Art
 1970 president, FIAP art committee
 1971 produces «Les Centrichimigrammes»
 1973 Radioscopie broadcast, J. Chancel
 1974 creates the Chiiteau d'Eau Municipal Gallery at Toulouse
 1975 first photographer to be admitted «marine painter». Member of the S.F.P. and the R.I.P. (F)
 1976 opens the Jean Dieuzaide Gallery in Toulouse. President of the National Association of Photographers, Reporters and Illustrators
 1979 Clemence lsaure Prize and Prix des Metiers d'Art (Midi-Pyrenees)
 1981 Officier: Order of Merit and Order of Arts an Literature.

Management of Jean Dieuzaide's photo collection

Dieuzaide died on 18 September 2003 at his home 7, rue Erasme, Toulouse, France. Jean Dieuzaide's photographs were for the largest part given in September 2016 to Toulouse city, which keeps, classifies, scans and promotes the collection.

References

External links 
  Biography of Jean Dieuzaide, description and scanning of the collection
  Photographer website

French photographers
People from Haute-Garonne
1921 births
2003 deaths
Officers of the Ordre national du Mérite
Officiers of the Ordre des Arts et des Lettres
Portrait photographers
Humanist photographers